Lora Fanni Komoróczy (born 22 February 2006) is a Hungarian competitive swimmer who specializes in sprint backstroke and butterfly events. At the 2022 World Junior Championships, she won the gold medal in the 50-metre backstroke and placed eighth in the final of the 50-metre butterfly. At the 2022 World Aquatics Championships, she placed seventeenth in the 50-metre backstroke.

Background
Komoróczy was born 22 February 2006 in Budapest and currently trains with Iron SE swim club under the guidance of coach Imre Takács.

Career

2021–2022
As a 15-year-old at the 2021 Hungarian Short Course Championships in Kaposvár in November, Komoróczy won the gold medal in the 50-metre backstroke, setting a new youth record, the fastest time swum in the event by a female Hungarian swimmer 17 years of age or younger. The following year, at the senior 2022 World Aquatics Championships, with pool swimming competition held in June at Danube Arena in Budapest, she placed seventeenth overall in the 50-metre backstroke with a time of 28.49 seconds.

2022 European Junior Championships
At the 2022 European Junior Swimming Championships, held in July Otopeni, Romania, Komoróczy won the silver medal in the 50-metre backstroke with a personal best time of 28.31 seconds, finishing 0.31 seconds ahead of bronze medalist Roos Vanotterdijk of Belgium. For her other events, she won a silver medal as part of the 4×100-metre medley relay, swimming butterfly in both the preliminary heats and the final, placed fourth in the final of the 100-metre backstroke with a personal best time of 1:01.80, placed fourth in the 4×100-metre mixed medley relay, swimming butterfly in the preliminaries and backstroke in the final, placed thirteenth in the semifinals of the 50-metre butterfly with a 27.46, and placed seventeenth in the 100-metre butterfly with a personal best time of 1:01.97.

2022 World Junior Championships

In the preliminaries of the 100-metre backstroke on day one of the 2022 FINA World Junior Swimming Championships, conducted beginning 30 August in Lima, Peru, Komoróczy placed 20th in the 100-metre backstroke with a time of 1:04.86. The next day, she helped rank third in the preliminaries of the 4×100-metre mixed medley relay, swimming the backstroke leg in 1:03.13, and qualify the relay to the final, where she was substituted out and the finals relay was disqualified for early start by the male swimmer on the butterfly leg of the relay. Two days later, she started off the evening session with a time of 28.48 seconds and overall first-rank in the semifinals of the 50-metre backstroke, qualifying for the final the following day. In her second event of the evening, she placed eighth in the final of the 50-metre butterfly with a time of 27.66 seconds, which was 1.28 seconds behind gold medalist Jana Pavalić of Croatia.

Komoróczy began the fifth day of competition in the morning by not starting the 100-metre butterfly preliminaries. In the evening session, she won the gold medal in the 50-metre backstroke with a time of 28.51 seconds, finishing 0.19 seconds ahead of silver medalist Aimi Nagaoka of Japan and 0.42 seconds ahead of bronze medalist Sara Curtis of Italy. The sixth and final day, she helped achieve a fourth-place finish in the final of the 4×100-metre medley relay in 4:09.33, splitting a 1:01.60 for the butterfly leg of the relay.

2022 Hungarian Short Course Championships
For the 2022 Hungarian National Short Course Championships, held in November in Kaposvár when Komoróczy was 16 years old, she won the national title and gold medal in the 50-metre backstroke with a personal best time of 27.09 seconds on day one, which was over eight-tenths of a second faster than the second-place finisher. The second day, she won the bronze medal in the 100-metre backstroke with a personal best time of 59.84 seconds and then placed fourth in the final of the 100-metre individual medley with a personal best time of 1:01.29. The following evening, she won the gold medal and national title in the 50-metre butterfly with a personal best time of 26.56 seconds. Day four of four, she achieved an eighth-place finish in the final of the 100-metre butterfly with a personal best time of 1:00.25.

International championships (50 m)

 Komoróczy swam only in the preliminary heats.
 Komoróczy was not a member of the finals relay that was disqualified.

Personal best times

Long course meters (50 m pool)

Short course metres (25 m pool)

References

External links
 

2006 births
Living people
Swimmers from Budapest
Hungarian female backstroke swimmers
Hungarian female butterfly swimmers